The Ritz-Carlton Club and Residences is a  luxury residential skyscraper in the Financial District of San Francisco, California.  The residences are built atop the historic Old Chronicle Building, sometimes called the de Young Building, which was constructed in 1890. It is the first skyscraper built in California.

History

In 1888, M. H. de Young, owner of the San Francisco Chronicle, commissioned Burnham and Root to design a signature building to house his newspaper.  Finished in 1890, the Chronicle Building stood ten stories, with a clock tower reaching  in height, becoming San Francisco's first skyscraper and the tallest building on the West Coast.

In 1905, a celebration of the re-election of Mayor Eugene Schmitz stopped in front of the building and launched fireworks, which ignited the wooden clock tower atop the building.  The damaged clock tower was removed and de Young added two additional floors along Market Street and a 16-story annex along Kearny Street.  The Chronicle Building survived the 1906 San Francisco earthquake but was badly damaged by the ensuing fire, which gutted the interior.  The building was rebuilt by architect Willis Polk, who ran the San Francisco office of Burnham and Root. In 1924, the Chronicle moved to its present location at Fifth and Mission streets, and the old Chronicle Building became a normal office building, thenceforth known as the de Young Building or Old Chronicle Building.

In 1962, in an effort to modernize the building, its owners covered the original masonry facade with a new facade of aluminum, glass, and porcelain paneling.  By 2004, new owners received approval to restore the original facade, convert the building to residential use, and add eight stories to the existing structure. The Old Chronicle Building was designated San Francisco Landmark No. 243 in 2004.  The building re-opened as the Ritz-Carlton Club and Residences in November 2007.

Gallery

See also

 San Francisco's tallest buildings
 List of early skyscrapers

References

External links

Residential skyscrapers in San Francisco
Financial District, San Francisco
Newspaper headquarters in the United States
Commercial buildings completed in 1890
San Francisco Designated Landmarks
Buildings and structures destroyed in the 1906 San Francisco earthquake
San Francisco Chronicle